The 30th British Academy Film Awards, given by the British Academy of Film and Television Arts on 24 March 1977, honoured the best films of 1976.

Winners and nominees

BAFTA Fellowship: Denis Forman

Statistics

See also
 49th Academy Awards
 2nd César Awards
 29th Directors Guild of America Awards
 34th Golden Globe Awards
 3rd Saturn Awards
 29th Writers Guild of America Awards

References

British Academy Film Awards
British Academy Film Awards
Film030
British Academy Film Awards
British Academy Film Awards
1976 awards in the United Kingdom